Rodrigo Melo e Lima (born 30 June 1982) is a Brazilian former professional footballer who played as a defender.

Career
Melo began in the youth system of Rio de Janeiro club Botafogo. He played for Bangu in the 2009 Campeonato Carioca, making his professional bow against Macaé on 1 February. He was selected six further times for the club. Later that year, Melo joined Second Division side Quissamã. However, he was soon forced to retire due to injury issues.

Career statistics

References

External links

1982 births
Living people
Place of birth missing (living people)
Brazilian footballers
Association football defenders
Bangu Atlético Clube players